Gowrie is a region in central Scotland and one of the original provinces of the Kingdom of Alba. It covered the eastern part of what became Perthshire. It was located to the immediate east of Atholl, and originally included the area around Perth (and the ancient Scottish royal sites of Scone), though that was later detached as Perthia. 

Its chief settlement is the city of Perth. Today it is most often associated with the Carse of Gowrie, the part of Gowrie south of the Sidlaw Hills running east of Perth to Dundee.

Etymology
It is usually written as Goverin or Gouerin in the Latin of the Middle Ages. The Old Gaelic terms Circinn and Mag Gerghinn (and variants), may be related; but Circinn is often identified with the Mearns because Fordoun, Mearns, was said to have been in this area. Alex Woolf and William J. Watson both implied that the name derived from the Cenél nGabraín. The modern Gaelic for the province is Gobharaidh; unless it is derived from Gerghinn or Circinn, the earlier Gaelic form is not recorded in Gaelic orthography.

Geography
Gowrie contains some of the best farmland in the whole of Scotland, a key to explaining its importance in Scottish history. The Carse of Gowrie, the southern part of the region, has traditionally been called the "Garden of Scotland".

Coupar, the location of Coupar Angus Abbey, lay at the borders of Angus with Gowrie, originally on the Gowrie side. Blairgowrie, "Plain of Gowrie", was recorded as "Blair in Gowrie" in 1604, and presumably the Blair ("plain") element has -gowrie attached to it to distinguish it from Blair in Atholl, i.e. Blair Atholl. Abernethy, where the cross of MacDuff marked the boundary of the kindred, was probably the boundary between Fothriff and Gowrie.

The following is a list of modern settlements and places of interest in the province:

 Abernyte
 Alyth
 Balhousie
 Ballindean
 Bankfoot
 Benvie
 Blair or Blairgowrie
 Cambusmichael
 Cargill
 Clunie
 Coupar Angus
 Collace
 Craigdallie
 Dunbarney (also Pottie)
 Dunsinane
 Errol
Forteviot
 Fowlis
 Inchtuthill
 Inchture
 Inchyra
 Inveralmond
 Kilspindie
 Kinclaven
 Kinfauns
 Kinnaird
 Kinnoull
 Kirkmichael
 Longforgan (also Forgan or Forgrund)
 Luncarty
 Meikleour
 Methven
 Perth
 Pitmiddle (now deserted)
 Rait
 Redgorton
 Rhynd
 Rossie (also Rossinclerach)
 Ruthven
 Scone
 St Madoes (or Cairnie)
 Strathardle

Forteviot, physically on the Earn, was included in the St Andrews deanery of Gowrie not in Strathearn (diocese of Dunblane). It is unclear if Gowrie was thought to include places such as Dunkeld or the province of Stormont; it is likely that Gowrie's boundaries may have conceptually fluctuated according to various political changes over time.

History

The Scottish royal coronation site was located in this province, at Scone. Containing sites such as Scone and Forteviot, and perhaps originally Abernethy, it was clearly the core province of the early Kingdom of Scotland. In the 12th century, when detailed records begin, the king possessed four royal manors in the province; these manors were Scone, Strathardle, Longforgan, and Coupar. Those four royal manors were held by the crown in addition to the rest of the province, which the king held as mormaer ("earl").

In either the reign of Alexander I or David I a burgh was founded in the province, located at Perth. It also had a sheriff, called the "Sheriff of Gowrie" or "Sheriff of Scone", from the 1130s until at least 1228. It is not clear if this sheriff was originally distinct from the "Sheriff of Perth", as Perth and Scone were often thought of as the same location, being only two miles apart; if they were originally distinct, they were not so by the following century.

There are judices, "Brehons", of the province of Gowrie recorded from the 12th century into the 14th century. These men were the specialist lawmen for the province, who preserved legal knowledge relevant to the provincial community, and it is likely that every province of Scotland had lawmen designated for such purposes.

Ecclesiastically, Gowrie was largely controlled by the Bishop of St Andrews; a Dean of Gowrie existed under the said bishop. Half a dozen or so of the parish churches in Gowrie were under the control of the bishops of Dunblane and Dunkeld; this meant that Deans of Gowrie also existed for these two dioceses, though no Dean of Gowrie was recorded for the diocese of Dunblane.

Gowrie was recreated as an earldom for William Ruthven, Lord Ruthven in 1581.John Ruthven, 3rd Earl of Gowrie, the second son of William Ruthven, was involved in the famous Gowrie Conspiracy of 1600, which led to the forfeiture of the earldom. The title of Earl of Gowrie was resurrected in 1945 for a descendant of the 2nd Earl.

The area covered by the sheriff of Perth - the sheriffdom - included Atholl, Breadalbane, and Strathearn, as well as Gowrie. In the mid 19th century, local government reforms replaced the ancient provinces by new Counties (shires), aligned to sheriffdom boundaries; hence, Gowrie became part of the new Perthshire.

Notes

References
 Barrow, G. W. S. (ed.), The Acts of Malcolm IV, (Regesta Regum Scottorum, Volume I, Edinburgh, 1960)
 Barrow, G.W.S., "The Judex", in G. W. S. Barrow (ed.) The Kingdom of the Scots, (Edinburgh, 2003), pp. 57–67
 Duncan, A. A. M., The Kingship of the Scots 842–1292: Succession and Independence, (Edinburgh, 2002)
 Duncan, A. A. M., Scotland: The Making of the Kingdom, (Edinburgh, 1975)
 Grant, Alexander, "Thanes and Thanages, from the eleventh to the Fourteenth Centuries" in A. Grant & K. Stringer (eds.), Medieval Scotland: Crown, Lordship and Community, Essays Presented to G.W.S. Barrow, (Edinburgh, 1993), pp. 39–81
 Juhala, Amy L., "Ruthven, John, third earl of Gowrie (1577/8–1600)", Oxford Dictionary of National Biography, Oxford University Press, 2004 , accessed 11 Nov 2007
 MacGregor, Lindsay J., & Oram, Richard, Atholl and Gowrie: North Perthshire, A Historical Guide, (Edinburgh, 2000)
 
 Reid, N. H., & Barrow, G. W. S., The Sheriffs of Scotland: An Interim List to C.1306, (St. Andrews, 2002) 
 Ross, David, Scottish Place-Names,  (Edinburgh, 2001)
 Watson, W.J., The Celtic Place-Names of Scotland, (Edinburgh, 1926) reprinted, with an Introduction, full Watson bibliography and corrigenda by Simon Taylor (Edinburgh, 2004)
 Woolf, Alex, From Pictland to Alba, 789–1070, (Edinburgh, 2007)

History of Perth and Kinross
Geography of Perth and Kinross
Provinces of Scotland